Charles Juste François Victurnien, de  Beauvau, Prince of Craon (1793–1864) was a 19th-century French senator and army officer. He was styled the Prince of Beauvau.

Charles was born on 7 March 1793 at Sunninghill in Berkshire, while his parents, Marc Étienne Gabriel, Prince of Beauvau-Craon and Nathalie Henriette Victurnienne de Montemart, were in exile in England from the French revolution.

After the family returned to France, he entered the French army in 1810, during the Napoleonic Wars, becoming an officer of carabiniers, two years later, during the campaign against Russia. He was nominated senator, and elected Councillor-General of the Meurthe in 1854.

References 

 Martin, Frédérick (1870), Handbook of Contemporary Biography

1793 births
1864 deaths
Charles
Charles
French Senators of the Second Empire
French Army officers
French military personnel of the Napoleonic Wars
French refugees
People of the French Revolution
People from Sunninghill
Princes of Beauvau